"Freek-a-Leek" is an American hip hop song co-written and recorded by American rapper Petey Pablo. It was released on December 1, 2003, as the second single from his second album, Still Writing in My Diary: 2nd Entry (2004). It was produced by Lil Jon and is an example of a crunk song. The single peaked at number seven on the US Billboard Hot 100 in July 2004.

Background and recording 
In 2000, following an appearance on the remix of the Black Rob single "Whoa!", Petey Pablo caught the attention of rapper and record producer Timbaland, as well as the A&R manager of Jive Records, who helped Pablo acquire a deal with the record label. Pablo's first single, "Raise Up", was an instant commercial success, reaching the top 25 on the US Billboard Hot 100 and receiving heavy airplay on MTV. Diary of a Sinner: 1st Entry, his debut studio album, was released later in the year and initially sold well due to the success of "Raise Up": however, the follow-up singles "I Told Y'all" and "I" failed to have any major impact on the charts. Consequently, Pablo's material received very little promotion from Jive over the next few years and the release of his second album Still Writing in My Diary: 2nd Entry, originally set for 2002, was postponed indefinitely: it was not released until 2004.

Despite these delays, Pablo continued to record material for the album, eventually completing it during 2003. He recorded "Freek-a-Leek" following studio sessions with Atlanta record producer Lil Jon, whose popularity had increased following his work with southern hip hop duo the Ying Yang Twins. Before Lil Jon began work with Petey Pablo, at the request of Jive he had made fifteen productions for American rapper Mystikal, who also recorded for the label, although he passed most of them on. One of these, the production that would eventually become "Freek-a-Leek", was given to Pablo by Jive without Jon's knowledge, after which he recorded the song. Meanwhile, thinking that the beat had not been used, Lil Jon gave the production to American singer Usher for his single "Yeah!", from which a rough version of the song was recorded, mixed and mastered. Although Lil Jon eventually realized the mistake after Pablo played him "Freek-a-Leek" during one of their studio sessions, Pablo was unwilling to give up the song, especially as it was already receiving airplay on Southern hip hop radio. As a result, Lil Jon created an entirely new instrumental for "Yeah!", and Jive Records solicited "Freek-a-Leek" as the first single from Still Writing in My Diary: 2nd Entry on December 16, 2003, through release as a vinyl single.

Composition and lyrics 
A Southern hip hop song of three minutes and fifty-five seconds in length, "Freek-a-Leek" draws heavily from the musical genre of crunk, while being backed by an instrumentation which features a "slowly strolling riff", as well as following a tempo described as "heavy-synthed marching band-inspired". It begins and ends with a fake radio show, with Pablo acting as an impromptu host as well as introducing the song. Pablo's vocals are built around a "novation synth" based melody, with a flute becoming audible during the chorus as well as a set of "cleverly layered vocal chants".

The lyrics of "Freek-a-Leek" were noted for their heavily sexually explicit nature: according to David Jeffries of AllMusic, "Pablo rattles off the names of different drugs, girls and sexual positions as if he was checking off his grocery list".

Remix
The remix features Jermaine Dupri and Twista. The song appears on Twista's Kamikaze.

Music video and use in other media
The music video was directed by Erik White and features actress Esther Baxter. The opening scene is based on the film Belly. The sound was also featured in the Midnight Club 3 Soundtrack.

In 2019, American rapper Saweetie sampled the beat of "Freek-a-Leek" in her song "My Type".

Charts

Weekly charts

Year-end charts

Certifications

References

2003 singles
2003 songs
A&M Records singles
Crunk songs
Dirty rap songs
Jive Records singles
Petey Pablo songs
Song recordings produced by Lil Jon
Songs written by Craig Love
Songs written by Lil Jon